The 1982 Giro di Lombardia was the 76th edition of the Giro di Lombardia cycle race and was held on 16 October 1982. The race started in Milan and finished in Como. The race was won by Giuseppe Saronni of the Del Tongo team.

General classification

References

1982
Giro di Lombardia
Giro di Lombardia
Giro di Lombardia
1982 Super Prestige Pernod